Red&White is a Russian retailer with a network of eponymous self-service shops. The network bills itself as "shopping at home." Although the shops have a wider range of products than liquor stores, their main business is the sale of prepackaged alcoholic beverages. The head office is located in Chelyabinsk. Also, the company has 18 regional offices.

The word "Red" in the name represents wine, and "White" represents vodka.

History 
In the early 1990s, Sergei Studennikov founded SPS, a holding company engaged in the distribution of alcohol and tobacco. The first shop called "Red&White" was opened in Kopeysk on 11 August 2006. By the end of the year, the network consisted of 8 stores. in 2007, the chain had expanded to 38 stores. In 2014, the network consisted of 1,700 stores in 27 regions. In July 2015, the network of Red&White included more than 2,500 stores in 39 regions. In 2016, the company had more than 3,000 stores and 4 distribution centers. In 2017, Forbes reported Red&White as having 4,715 stores.

Activities 
Due to the large size of the network, the company is able to sell about 30 items under its store brand, and is a key customer for some manufacturers. As of 2022, the company's network includeв over 12000 stores. 

All shops are connected to Russia's Unified State Automated Information System (USAIS), an automated system for state control over the volume of production and distribution of ethanol and alcoholic drinks.

Performance indicators 
In 2015, Red&White took seventh place in the ranking of fastest growing companies in Russia, based on financial results for the period from 2011 to 2014. In 2014, the revenue of the Red&White network amounted to 47 billion rubles (US$ billion), an increase from 10 billion in 2011 (US$ billion), after increasing to 18 billion rubles in 2012 (US$ billion), and then 29 billion rubles in 2013. Forbes estimated revenue for 2015 as 82.5 billion rubles (US$ billion), a year-over-year increase of almost 80%, and named Red&White as the 84th largest private company in Russia. In 2017, Forbes estimated 2016 revenue of 145 billion rubles (US$ billion), listing Red&White as the 51st largest private company in Russia. Revenue increased to 210 billion rubles (US$ billion) for 2017.

Forbes named Studennikov as one of the 200 richest businessmen of Russia in 2015 and 2016 with a net worth of about US$400 million, increasing to $550 million in their 2017 list. In October 2018, Bloomberg estimated Studennikov's net worth at over US$1 billion.

In October 2021, Mercury Retail Holding PLC, the owner of "Krasnoe & Beloe", submitted for an IPO at Moscow Exchange. Main stakeholders of “Mercury Retail” are Sergei Studennikov and his family- 49%, Igor Kesaev - 37% and Sergei Katsiev with 8%. 6% are held by minor shareholders. Hereafter, the company declared, that IPO is postponed due to market situation. Meanwhile, on November, 25th, "Mercury Retail" confirmed to be absolutely ready for IPO, still waiting for favourable environment on the market.

References 

Convenience stores
Wine retailers
Russian brands
Retail companies of Russia
Alcohol distribution retailers
Companies based in Chelyabinsk